Since 2006, the Taiwan Foundation for Democracy confers the Asia Democracy and Human Rights Award on an individual or organization which has made major contributions through peaceful means to the development of democracy and human rights in Asia. Every year the award is conferred in December in Taipei during a special ceremony.

Winners

References

Human rights awards